Ants Käärma (born 4 April 1942 in Võitra) is an Estonian agronomist and politician. He has been a member of the VII, VIII, and IX Riigikogu.

References

Living people
1942 births
Estonian agronomists
Conservative People's Party of Estonia politicians
20th-century Estonian politicians
21st-century Estonian politicians
Speakers of the Riigikogu
Members of the Riigikogu, 1992–1995
Members of the Riigikogu, 1995–1999
Members of the Riigikogu, 1999–2003
Estonian University of Life Sciences alumni
Recipients of the Order of the National Coat of Arms, 2nd Class
Recipients of the Order of the National Coat of Arms, 5th Class
Voters of the Estonian restoration of Independence
People from Lääneranna Parish